Helge Boes (June 20, 1970 – February 5, 2003) was an operations officer with the Central Intelligence Agency.

Early life and education 
On Jun 20, 1970, Helge Boes was born to Roderich and Monika Boes in Hamburg, Germany. In 1972, the family moved to West Berlin. Boes attended John F. Kennedy School, a German-American elementary and high school, graduating in 1989.

In 1989, Boes moved to Kennesaw, Georgia and enrolled at Georgia State University. He graduated summa cum laude in 1992. He then entered Harvard Law School, graduating cum laude in 1997.

Career 
Helge worked as an attorney with Latham & Watkins until January, 2001, when he decided to join the CIA. There, he worked as an operations officer in the Counterterrorist Center.

Boes was killed while participating in United States counterterrorism efforts in eastern Afghanistan.  He was taking part in a live-fire exercise when a grenade detonated prematurely, killing him and wounding two others.  He was the second CIA officer to die as part of Operation Enduring Freedom, the first being paramilitary officer Mike Spann on November 25, 2001.

Boes was survived by his wife, Cindy, his parents, Roderich and Monika Boes of Germany, and his brother Henrik.

External links
 CIA Press Release: Tenet Announces Death of CIA Officer in Afghanistan
 Harvard Law Bulletin: A Born Soldier
 

1970 births
2003 deaths
Georgia State University alumni
Harvard Law School alumni